A sideshow (so-called in the San Francisco Bay Area, and a street takeover in the Los Angeles area ) is an informal demonstration of automotive stunts now often held in vacant lots, and public intersections, originally seen in the East Bay region of the San Francisco Bay Area, United States. Sideshows first appeared in Oakland, California in the 1980s as informal social gatherings of Bay Area youth. Sideshows were made even more popular throughout the 1990s with such songs as Bay Area rapper Richie Rich's "Sideshow" anthem. "Down Bancroft / To the light / Let me warm it up, I hit a donut tight / Chevy on my side / Windows straight tinted / He got hype when he saw me spinnin’ / I’m up outta there, sideways to the next light"

History

Sideshows first emerged on the streets of Oakland, California during the mid 1980s. The first sideshows were originally ad hoc carshows where people would congregate in the Eastmont Mall or Foothill Square parking lot. The original intent of the sideshows at this time was for people to show off their cars, usually American muscle cars made by General Motors and Ford from the 1960s and 1970s. These cars were often highly customized with elaborate paint jobs, all leather interiors, tinted windows, wire rims and modified high performance engines. Around the early 1990s, sideshows grew so popular that they had outgrown the parking lots of Eastmont Mall and Foothill Square. By the mid '90s, the sideshow became the alternative hot spot for those too young to gain entrance into 21 and over nightclubs.

In the 21st century, sideshows have become increasingly popular in other cities, such as Los Angeles, Kansas City, Detroit and in multiple cities in Texas

Activities

Common activities at sideshows include doughnuts and ghostriding. The latter involves driving a car, opening the door and climbing out, blasting off, sometimes onto the hood, sometimes standing or dancing next to the car while the car continues to roll. Violent incidents, including fights and shootings, sometimes occur at the events.

Law enforcement

To crack down on the illegal sideshows, the Oakland Police Department opened a police substation at Eastmont Mall and set up "No Cruising Zones" along International Boulevard. In efforts to keep the events from spreading west to Downtown Oakland, an additional no cruising law was established along Grand Avenue and Lakeshore Avenue in 1996. The phenomenon is most strongly associated with the city of Oakland (the birthplace of the sideshow), with the events there often being attended by those in the hip hop community. Such events are promoted in local rap by artists including E-40.

On June 8, 2005, the Oakland City Council narrowly defeated a measure (pushed by then-mayor Jerry Brown) which would have subjected spectators at sideshows to criminal sanctions, such as fines and even jail terms.  Drivers face various penalties, including having their cars impounded. On April 30, 2019, the San Jose City Council passed an ordinance making spectators punishable with a fine of up to $1,000 and 6 months in jail.

On February 23, 2023, the state of Texas launched a taskforce to address sideshows

See also
 Hyphy

References

Culture in the San Francisco Bay Area
Automotive events
Culture of Oakland, California